WANY-FM (100.9 FM) is a radio station licensed to Albany, Kentucky, United States.  The station is currently owned by local Pamela Allred and operates with a country music format. WANY maintains studios and transmitter facilities along KY 1590 (Burkesville Road) on the west side of Albany.

History
WANY-FM and its now-defunct AM sister station WANY went on the air at 106.3 FM. October 25, 1958. The stations were co-owned by Cecil Speck and Wallace Allred. The station changed frequencies to its current 100.9 FM in 2012.

References

External links

ANY-FM